You Never Can Tell is 1951 American comedy film directed by Lou Breslow and starring Dick Powell, Peggy Dow and Joyce Holden.

Plot
An ex-army dog named King inherits a fortune from his eccentric millionaire owner. Should King die, the fortune will pass to the late millionaire's secretary, Ellen (Peggy Dow). Perry Collins (Charles Drake) calls to visit King, ingratiating himself with the story that he remembers King from his army days and that he rescued King from a jeep accident. But Collins has designs on both Ellen and the fortune she will inherit on King's death and when King is found poisoned, King's spirit asks Lion (the leader in the heaven for animals) to send him back to earth to solve his own murder. He returns as Rex Shepard, a private investigator (Dick Powell). Lion also sends Golden Harvest, a racehorse, back to earth as Goldie Harvey (Joyce Holden) to help Rex. Goldie and Rex must solve the case before the full moon or they will have to remain on earth as humans.

Cast
 Dick Powell as Rex Shepard
 Peggy Dow as Ellen Hathaway
 Joyce Holden as Golden Harvest / Goldie Harvey
 Charles Drake as Perry Collins
 Albert Sharpe as Grandpa Hathaway
 Lou Polan as Police Sergeant Novak
 Frank Nelson as Police Lieutenant Gilpin
 Will Vedder as Nicholas
 Frank Gerstle as Detective
 Ott George as Detective Lieutenant Louie Luisetti

References

Bibliography
 Worley, Alec. Empires of the Imagination: A Critical Survey of Fantasy Cinema from Georges Melies to The Lord of the Rings. McFarland, 2005.

External links

1950s English-language films
1950s fantasy comedy films
1951 comedy films
1951 films
American black-and-white films
American fantasy comedy films
Films about dogs
Films about reincarnation
Films about the afterlife
Films directed by Lou Breslow
Films scored by Hans J. Salter
Universal Pictures films
1950s American films